Farmington Falls is an unincorporated village in the town of Farmington, Franklin County, Maine, United States. Farmington Falls has a post office with ZIP code 04940.

References

Villages in Franklin County, Maine
Villages in Maine